The Bloch's gizzard shad (Nematalosa nasus), also known as gizzard shad, hairback, long-finned gizzard shad, long-ray bony bream and thread-finned gizzard shad, are a widespread and common, small to medium-sized anadromous fish found in all marine, freshwater and brackish waters throughout Indo-West Pacific, towards eastward of Andaman Sea, South China Sea and the Philippines to Korean peninsula. Single specimen recorded from waters of South Africa. It was described by Marcus Elieser Bloch in 1795.

The sardines are known to swim at a maximum depth of 30 metres. The largest known standard length for the species is 22 cm. The fish can separate from its sister species by the presence of a dark spot behind gill opening. Belly consists with 17 to 20and 9 to 13 scutes. It has 15 to 19 dorsal soft rays and 17 to 26 anal dorsal soft rays. It is a filter feeder and feeds on planktons. Widely used as a food fish, it can make in to fish balls and can eat both as fresh and dried forms.

See also
Commercial fish of Sri Lanka

References

External links
Escualosa thoracata at ITIS
Escualosa thoracata at WoRMS

Clupeidae
Fish described in 1795
Fish of the Philippines
Fish of Korea
Fish of China